Albi-Ville is a railway station in Albi, Occitanie, France, on the Toulouse–Rodez railway line.

Train services
The following services currently call at Albi-Ville:
night services (Intercités de nuit) Paris–Orléans–Figeac–Rodez–Albi
local service (TER Occitanie) Toulouse–Albi–Rodez

References

Railway stations in Tarn (department)
Railway stations in France opened in 1864